Do You Know Who I Am may refer to:

 A song by Elvis Presley appearing on the album From Memphis to Vegas/From Vegas to Memphis
 A British game show.  See Do You Know Who I Am?